Nagdaha is a lake in the Dhapakhel Village Development Committee (VDC) of Lalitpur District, in the Kathmandu Valley, Nepal.

Like many other water bodies and physical features of Kathmandu, the Nagdaha is also steeped in legends. According to one, a male serpent resides in Taudaha and the resident serpent of Nagdaha is female. During the rainy season the male serpent, widely spoken of in ancient scriptures and oral history of Kathmandu as a serpent king, makes a journey to the town of Panauti in order to participate in a festival. It is said that he stays with the female serpent of Nagdaha on his way to and back from Panauti. This union of the nagas, mythical half serpent, half human beings, is followed by heavy rain.

There is a statue of Nag at the north-western side of the lake.

Nagdaha is rich in aquatic wildlife. Many species of native fishes like barbs and snakeheads are abundant. This is also home to several bird species and is a great place for bird-watching. Black kite, Black drongo, Cattle egret, Oriental magpie robin, Common myna, Large-billed crow, Rose-ringed parakeet, Alexandrian Parakeet Common kingfisher, White-breasted kingfisher and Red-vented bulbul owlets more than 50 species are the resident birds. Several migratory species visit the lake in the summer and the winter. Some of the summer visitors are cuckoos, White-breasted waterhen, Common Moorhen, little grebe & Greater painted snipe. Whereas some of the winter visitors are Eurasian coot, Ferruginous Pochard, Northern Shoveler, Mallard, Gadwall and Great cormorant. A pair of Garganey were spotted by some seniors and young birders on 20 June 2020 and the pair stayed in the lake for about a week, Garganey are rare visitors, that was the first visit after 11 years in Kathmandu valley. Similarly, Lesser whistling duck, Little grebe is also a rare visitor in the valley.

Gallery

References

Lakes of Bagmati Province